Riverbank Academy (formerly Alice Stevens School) is a broad spectrum special secondary school situated in Binley, Coventry, England.

The school's history dates back to 1909 and it was relocated to its current site on Ashington Grove, Whitley in 1953. The school was previously named after a former Coventry City councillor who worked for the city's children. In January 2015, Alice Stevens School converted to academy status and was renamed Riverbank Academy.

The school is now located on Princethorpe way in Coventry.

External links
List of special school on Coventry City Council's website

Special schools in Coventry
Academies in Coventry
Special secondary schools in England